Naalaafushi (Dhivehi: ނާލާފުށި) is one of the inhabited islands of Meemu Atoll.

History

2004 tsunami and aftermath
Following the 2004 tsunami, 390 of the 465 population of the island were left without habitable homes. Within a few weeks of the disaster, the United Nations Development Programme had transported 190 tons of construction material to the island and intended to have all the residents rehoused by the middle of 2005.

Geography

Demography

Healthcare
Naalaafushi has a health center with a doctor and 3 nurses and a pharmacy.

Transport
Construction of the island's harbour was contracted to MTCC in 2014.

References

Islands of the Maldives